HD 79447 is a single star in the southern constellation of Carina. It has the Bayer designation i Carinae, while HD 79447 is the identifier from the Henry Draper catalogue. This star has a blue-white hue and is visible to the naked eye with an apparent visual magnitude of +3.96. It is located at a distance of approximately 540 light years from the Sun based on parallax, and has an absolute magnitude of −2.14. The star drifting further away with a radial velocity of +18 km/s. It is a candidate member of the Lower Centaurus–Crux group of the Sco OB2 association.

This object is a B-type main-sequence star with a stellar classification of B3V. It has an estimated age of around 39 million years with no measured spin rate. The star has about 5.6 times the radius of the Sun and 7 times the Sun's mass. It is radiating over two thousand times the luminosity of the Sun from its photosphere at an effective temperature of 18,900 K.

References 

B-type main-sequence stars
Lower Centaurus Crux
Carina (constellation)
Carinae, i
Durchmusterung objects
079447
045101
3663